Labdia glaucoxantha is a moth in the family Cosmopterigidae. It was described by Edward Meyrick in 1921. It is found in Australia, where it has been recorded from Queensland.

References

Labdia
Moths described in 1921